Samatovci  is a village near Bizovac, Croatia. It is connected by the D2 highway.

Name
The name of the village in Croatian is plural.

References

Populated places in Osijek-Baranja County